The national symbols of South Korea are official and unofficial flags, icons or cultural expressions that are emblematic, representative or otherwise characteristic of South Korea (the Republic of Korea) and of its culture. Since the division in 1948, South Korea retained traditional symbols to distinguish from the national symbols of North Korea.

Symbols